This article shows the highest selling contestants from Canadian Idol and the highest selling American Idol albums. These sales are Canadian sales only.

Canadian Idol

CI Artists with CRIA certified albums
This first list only includes contestants with at least one certified album. (Canadian Sales ONLY) Gold, Platinum, and/or Multi-platinum

CI Artists without CRIA certified albums
The following is a comprehensive list of other Canadian Idol alumni album sales and reflects that commercial success can be achieved through association with Canadian Idol and with post-Idol promotion, although the degree of success varies considerably''':

American Idol

AI Artists with CRIA certified albums

AI Artists without CRIA certified albums

References

External links
Canadian Recording Industry Association.ca
Myspace.com

Canadian Idol
American Idol